Major facilitator superfamily domain-containing protein 9 is a protein that in humans is encoded by the MFSD9 gene. It is a potential solute carrier, and called atypical solute carrier since it is not named according to the SLC nomenclature. It is expressed both in central and peripheral organs.

References 

Transport proteins